Kyle David Connor (born December 9, 1996) is an American professional ice hockey player for the  Winnipeg Jets of the National Hockey League (NHL). Connor was drafted 17th overall by the Jets in the 2015 NHL Entry Draft.

Playing career
Connor played minor ice hockey for Detroit Belle Tire and participated in the 2009 Quebec International Pee-Wee Hockey Tournament with them.

Junior
Connor joined the Youngstown Phantoms of the USHL during the 2012–13 season. During the 2013–14 season, Connor recorded 31 goals and 43 assists, in 56 games, setting a Phantoms franchise record for most points in a season with 74 points. His outstanding play was recognized when he was named to the 2013–14 USHL First All-Star Team.

During the 2014–15 season, Connor led the league in scoring, recording 34 goals and 46 assists, in 56 regular season games. He broke the Phantoms' franchise record for points in a season, with 80 points. He led the USHL with nine game-winning goals. Following an outstanding season, he was named to the 2014–15 USHL First All-Star Team, and was also named the USHL Forward of the Year and Player of the Year.

College
He committed to play for the Michigan Wolverines for the 2015–16 season. Connor was named the Big Ten First Star of the Week for the week ending October 20, 2015. In the season opener on October 16, Connor recorded two goals and an assist in his debut, the most points by a Michigan freshman in his debut since Jason Ryznar had three points (one goal and two assists) in his debut in the Cold War at Spartan Stadium on October 6, 2001. On October 18, he scored the game-winning goal against Mercyhurst.

Connor was named the Big Ten First Star of the Week for the week ending December 15, 2015. He recorded five goals and one assist in a split weekend series against Minnesota. On December 11, Connor recorded his first career hat-trick, becoming the first Michigan freshman to record a hat-trick in a game since Michael Woodford in 2001. Connor was named to the GLI-all-tournament team, and was named MVP at the 2015 Great Lakes Invitational.

Connor was named the Hockey Commissioners' Association (HCA) National Rookie of the Month for December 2015. Connor led the nation with seven goals and 13 points in six games during the month of December, averaging 2.17 points per game in that span. He registered at least one point in all six games, including four multi-point efforts. His overall average of 1.47 points per game this season is the most by a Michigan freshman since the 1979–80 season.

Connor was named the Big Ten Second Star of the Week for the week ending January 12, 2016. During that time he recorded three goals and three assists, including a career-best five-points on January 8, against Michigan State. Connor was named the Big Ten Second Star of the Week for the week ending February 2, 2016. During that time he recorded two goals and four assists in two games against Penn State. On January 28, Connor matched a career-high with five points, including the game-winning goal. By reaching 20 goals in 22 games, he and teammate Tyler Motte were the fastest Michigan players to reach 20 goals since Kevin Porter had 20 goals in 21 games during the 2007–08 season. Connor became the first Michigan freshman to score 20 goals since Jeff Tambellini scored 26 goals during the 2002–03 season.

Connor was named the HCA National Rookie of the Month for the month of January, 2016. He ranked second nationally with 1.33 goals, 1.50 assists and 2.83 points per game last month, trailing only linemates Motte in goals and points and J. T. Compher in assists. Connor was named the Big Ten First Star of the Week for the week ending February 23, 2016. He joined Tyler Motte as the only players in the Big Ten to earn First Star of the Week honors three times this season. Connor is the fifth Michigan freshman ever to reach the 50-point mark, and the first since current assistant coach Brian Wiseman reached the mark in 1990–91.

Connor was named the Big Ten Second Star of the Week for the week ending March 1, 2016. Connor is in the midst of a 23-game point streak, the longest by a Michigan player since Mike Knuble had points in 21 straight games during the 1994–95 season. He is the first Michigan player to reach 60 points since Kevin Porter recorded 63 points in 2007–08, and the first Michigan freshman to reach the 30-goal mark since Danny Felsner had 30 goals in 1988–89. Connor is also the first freshman in college hockey to record 30 goals since Thomas Vanek in 2002–03. Connor was named the Big Ten First Star of the Week for the week ending March 15. Connor extended his Red Berenson-era (since 1984) Michigan record point streak to 23 games with four goals in two wins against Penn State.

Following an outstanding freshman season with the Wolverines, Connor was named the Big Ten Conference ice hockey Player of the Year and Freshman of the Year. He was also named to both the Big Ten All-Freshman Team and the All-Big Ten First Team. He was also Big Ten Scoring Champion, recording 30 goals, and 31 assists in 34 games. He was also named the NCAA Ice Hockey National Rookie of the Year and an AHCA First Team All-American. Connor was runner-up for the Hobey Baker Award, losing to Jimmy Vesey.

During the quarterfinals of the 2016 Big Ten Men's Ice Hockey Tournament, Connor scored four goals, breaking the record for most goals in a single Big Ten Tournament game. Connor became the first Michigan player to score four goals in a game since Kevin Porter on March 28, 2008. During the championship game, Connor and teammate Zach Werenski tied the record for most assists in the Big Ten tournament championship game with three assists. Connor and Werenski also tied the record for most points in a championship game with four points. Connor holds the record for most goals in a single Big Ten tournament with five goals, while Connor and teammate J. T. Compher are tied for the most points in a single Big Ten tournament with eight points. He was named the Big Ten Tournament Most Outstanding Player and named to the Big Ten All-Tournament Team.

Professional
On April 11, 2016, Connor signed a three-year, two-way contract with the Winnipeg Jets. Connor recorded his first NHL goal in a 4–1 win over the Dallas Stars on October 27, 2016.  Before the Winnipeg Jets finalized their 2017–18 roster, Connor was assigned to the Manitoba Moose. However, he was recalled to the NHL on October 16, and scored his first goal of the season the following day against the Columbus Blue Jackets. At season's end, he finished fourth in the voting for the Calder Memorial Trophy. On March 23, 2019, Connor scored his first career NHL hat-trick in a 5–0 win over the Nashville Predators.

On September 28, 2019, Connor signed a seven-year, $50 million contract with the Jets. Later, on December 31, 2019, Connor would go on to score his second career NHL hat trick in a 7–4 win over the Colorado Avalanche.

International play

Connor represented the United States at the 2013 World Junior A Challenge, where he recorded two goals and three assists in four games and won a gold medal. Connor scored the game-winning goal in the championship game against Russia. Connor again represented the United States at the 2014 World Junior A Challenge where he recorded one goal and one assist in four games, and won a gold medal.

Connor represented the United States at the 2014 IIHF World U18 Championships, where he recorded four goals and three assists in seven games, and won a gold medal.

Connor represented the United States at the 2016 IIHF World Championship alongside line-mates J. T. Compher and Tyler Motte. He recorded two assists in five games.

Career statistics

Regular season and playoffs

International

Awards and honors

References

External links

1996 births
Living people
American men's ice hockey left wingers
Lady Byng Memorial Trophy winners
Manitoba Moose players
Michigan Wolverines men's ice hockey players
National Hockey League first-round draft picks
People from Clinton, Macomb County, Michigan
People from Oceana County, Michigan
Sportspeople from Metro Detroit
Winnipeg Jets draft picks
Winnipeg Jets players
Youngstown Phantoms players
Ice hockey players from Michigan
AHCA Division I men's ice hockey All-Americans